The 1963 Pickens 200 was a NASCAR Grand National Series event that was held on June 30, 1963, at Greenville-Pickens Speedway in Greenville, South Carolina.

The transition to purpose-built racecars began in the early 1960s and occurred gradually over that decade.  Changes made to the sport by the late 1960s brought an end to the "strictly stock" vehicles of the 1950s.

Race report
Three lead changes ended up circulating amongst three different race leaders. Herman Beam, Johnny Divers and Crawford Clements were three of the notable crew chiefs that witnessed the event.

Two cautions were initiated by NASCAR with the average speed of the competitors being . J. D. McDuffie would crash into the wall on his first lap in his 1961 Ford Galaxie vehicle; causing him to become the last-place finisher of the race. Frank Warren would make his NASCAR debut racing against Buck Baker, Neil Castles, Joe Weatherly, Wendell Scott (NASCAR's first African-American competitor), and Cale Yarborough.

This racing event took place on a dirt track oval with 200 laps being the pre-determined number of laps according to the NASCAR officials who sanctioned the event.

Qualifying

Timeline
Section reference: 
 Start of race: Ned Jarrett started the race with the pole position while J.D. McDuffie's vehicle suffered from a terminal crash.
 Lap 10: Jack Smith's vehicle overheated, causing him to withdraw from the race.
 Lap 23: Bunkie Blackburn's engine came to a screeching halt; Billy Wade developed problems with his vehicle's differential.
 Lap 70: David Pearson takes over the lead from Ned Jarrett.
 Lap 71: Stick Elliott's V-gasket became problematic, causing him to leave the race.
 Lap 90: Curtis Crider's fuel pump developed problems, forcing him out of the race.
 Lap 106: Ned Jarrett takes over the lead from David Pearson.
 Lap 149: Richard Petty takes over the lead from Ned Jarrett.
 Lap 172: Neil Castles' vehicle had its spindle become problematic, forcing him to withdraw from the event.
 Finish: Richard Petty was officially declared the winner of the event.

Finishing order
Section reference: 

 Richard Petty (No. 41)
 Ned Jarrett (No. 11)
 Buck Baker (No. 87)
 Fred Harb (No. 2)
 Bobby Isaac (No. 99)
 David Pearson (No. 6)
 Tiny Lund (No. 32)
 Joe Weatherly (No.05)
 Frank Warren (No. X)
 Wendell Scott (No. 34)
 Ed Livingston (No. 56)
 Jimmy Pardue (No. 54)
 E.J. Trivette (No. 1)
 Neil Castles (No. 86)
 Cale Yarborough (No. 19)
 Curtis Crider (No. 89)
 Stick Elliott (No. 18)
 Billy Wade (No. 5)
 Bunkie Blackburn (No. 75)
 Jack Smith (No. 48)
 J.D. McDuffie (No. 76)

References

Pickens 200
South Car South Carolina
NASCAR races at Greenville-Pickens Speedway